Penioni Tagituimua (born 20 January 1999) is a Fijian professional rugby league footballer who plays as a  or  for the Kaiviti Silktails in the Ron Massey Cup and Fiji at international level.

Playing career
Tagituimua began playing rugby league in 2013 for the Nadera Panthers. While attending Suva Grammar School in 2015, he was awarded a three-year rugby union scholarship at Ellesmere College.

In 2019, Tagituimua was the only player from the Fijian domestic competition to be included in 's squad for their mid-season match against . Initially selected to be the 18th man, a number of injuries and unavailabilities allowed him to make his Test debut off the interchange bench in the 56–14 win. In November, Tagituimua played off the interchange bench in both of Fiji's Oceania Cup matches.

Tagituimua joined the Kaiviti Silktails for their inaugural season in 2020, scoring twice in their first and only match of the COVID-19 affected year. In 2021, Tagituimua was named the captain of the side. On 23 May 2021, he made his NSW Cup debut after being called into the North Sydney Bears' team to play Mounties.
In the second group stage match of the 2021 Rugby League World Cup, Tagituimua scored two tries for Fiji in their 60-4 victory over Italy.

Personal life
Tagituimua's father Ilaitia is a pastor and was a spiritual adviser for the Fijian team at the 2008, 2013, and 2017 Rugby League World Cups. Tagituimua's uncle Nemani Matirewa was a Fijian dual-code rugby international who was a pioneer of rugby league in the country.

References

External links
Fiji profile

1999 births
Living people
Fijian rugby league players
Fiji national rugby league team players
Kaiviti Silktails captains
Kaiviti Silktails players
Nadera Panthers players
North Sydney Bears NSW Cup players
Rugby league halfbacks
Rugby league hookers